The 1957 NCAA University Division baseball tournament was played at the end of the 1957 NCAA University Division baseball season to determine the national champion of college baseball.  The tournament concluded with eight teams competing in the College World Series, a double-elimination tournament in its eleventh year.  Eight regional districts sent representatives to the College World Series with preliminary rounds within each district serving to determine each representative.  These events would later become known as regionals.  Each district had its own format for selecting teams, resulting in 23 teams participating in the tournament at the conclusion of their regular season, and in some cases, after a conference tournament.  The College World Series was held in Omaha, NE from June 9 to June 14.  The eleventh tournament's champion was California, coached by George Wolfman.  The Most Outstanding Player was Cal Emery of Penn State.

Tournament

District 1

District 2
Games played at Brooklyn, New York

District 3

District 4

*–Indicates game required 10 innings.

District 5

District 6

District 7

District 8

College World Series

Participants

Results

Bracket

Game results

Notable players
 California: Earl Robinson
 Colorado State: Ron Herbel
 Connecticut: Moe Morhardt
 Florida State: Dick Howser
 Iowa State: Dick Bertell, Jerry McNertney
 Notre Dame: 
 Penn State: Cal Emery
 Texas: Howie Reed, Harry Taylor

See also
 1957 NCAA College Division baseball tournament
 1957 NAIA World Series

Notes

References

 

NCAA Division I Baseball Championship
Tournament
Baseball in Austin, Texas